Alexandrovka is a rural locality (a selo) in Yezhovskoye Rural Settlement, Kikvidzensky District, Volgograd Oblast, Russia. The population was 446 as of 2010. There are 8 streets.

Geography 
Alexandrovka is located on Khopyorsko-Buzulukskaya plain, 55 km northeast of Preobrazhenskaya (the district's administrative centre) by road. Polotskoye is the nearest rural locality.

References 

Rural localities in Kikvidzensky District